The Amman Message is a statement calling for tolerance and unity in the Muslim world that was issued on 9 November 2004 (27th of Ramadan 1425 AH) by King Abdullah II bin Al-Hussein of Jordan. Subsequently, a three-point ruling was issued by 200 Islamic scholars from over 50 countries, focusing on issues of defining who is a Muslim, excommunication from Islam (takfir), and principles related to delivering religious opinions (fatāwa).

Content
The Amman Message was delivered in Amman, Jordan, as a Ramadan sermon by Chief Justice Sheikh Iz-al-Din al-Tamimi in the presence of King Abdullah II and a number of Muslim scholars. According to a report issued by the International Crisis Group, "The sermon stressed the need to re-emphasise Islam's core values of compassion, mutual respect, tolerance, acceptance and freedom of religion." The next year, in July 2005, an Islamic convention brought together 200 Muslim scholars from over 50 countries who issued a three-point declaration (later known as 'Three Points of the Amman Message'). This declaration focused on:

The recognition of eight legal schools of sharia/fiqh (madhāhib) and the varying schools of Islamic theology viz.
Sunni Hanafi
Sunni Maliki
Sunni Shafi'i
Sunni Hanbali
Shia Jaʿfari
Shia Zaydi
Ẓāhirī
Ibadi
Forbade declaring an apostate anyone who is a follower of:
the Ashʿari/Maturidi creed 
real Tasawwuf (Sufism)
true Salafi thought 
The forbiddance from pronouncing disbelief (takfir) upon (or excommunicating) others recognized as Muslims
The stipulations placed as preconditions to the issuing of religious edicts, intended to prevent the circulation of illegitimate edicts

Explaining why the message was issued, King Abdullah stated: "[W]e felt that the Islamic message of tolerance was being subjected to a fierce and unjust attack from some in the West who do not understand Islam's essence, and others who claim to be associated with Islam and hide behind Islam to commit irresponsible deeds."

Conference and declarations
Following are conferences and declarations:
 The International Islamic Conference: True Islam and Its Role in Modern Society, (Amman, 27-29 Jumada II 1426 ah / 4–6 July 2005 ce)
 Forum of Muslim 'Ulama' and Thinkers, (Mecca, 5-7 Sha'ban 1426 ah / 9–11 September 2005 ce)
 First International Islamic Conference Concerning the Islamic Schools of Jurisprudence and the Modern Challenges, (Al al-Bayt University, 13-15 Shawwal ah /15–17 November 2005 ce)
 The Third Extraordinary Session of the Organization of the Islamic Conference, (5-6 Dhu'l-Qa'da 1426 ah / 7–8 December 2005 ce)
 The Second International Conference of the Assembly for Moderate Islamic Thought and Culture, (25-27 1 Rabi' 1427 ah / 24–26 April 2006 ce)
 The International Islamic Fiqh Academy Conference Seventeenth Session, (Amman, 28 Jumada I - 2 Jumada II 1427 ah / 24–28 June 2006 ce)
 Muslims of Europe Conference, (Istanbul, 1–2 July 2006 ce)
 The ninth session of the council of the Conference of Ministers of Religious Endowments and Islamic Affairs, (Kuwait, 20-21 1426 AH / 22–23 November 2005 CE)
 Amman Message in the Eyes of Others: Dialogue, Moderation, Humanity, (The Hashemite University, September 20–21, 2006)

Fatwas and endorsements
Following is the list of some of the many individuals and organizations who have issued fatwas and endorsements in relation to the Amman Message (as per official website listing):

Reception
Tony Blair, while Prime Minister of the United Kingdom, gave a speech in which he praised the Amman message and the gathering of numerous scholars, commenting, "This was a clear message that Islam is not a monolithic faith, but one made up of a rich pattern of diversity, albeit all flowing from the same fount."

Despite the ecumenical nature of the Amman Message, since it was issued there has been a marked decline in Shia-Sunni relations as a result of increased sectarian conflict in such countries as Iraq, Syria, Lebanon, Bahrain and Yemen.

Criticism
Suhail Nakhouda, writing in the Amman-based Islamica, stated that the Amman message did little to effectively address ongoing problems: "There is no water, no pavements; the economy is bad, and many young people are out of work. Peoples' lives, as well as the images they see, stay the same." Nakhouda stated that King Abdullah's message was likely to be dampened by his lifestyle, which he claims is the subject of criticism.

See also
 2016 international conference on Sunni Islam in Grozny
 Outline of Islam
 Glossary of Islam
 Index of Islam-related articles
 A Common Word Between Us and You
 Al-Azhar Shia Fatwa
 Interfaith dialogue
 Organisation of Islamic Cooperation
 International Islamic Unity Conference (Iran)

References

External links
 Official Website
 The Amman Message booklet (English Publications)
 Grand list of endorsements of the amman message and its three points

Islamic jurisprudence
Fatwas
Islam and society
Islam-related controversies
Madhhab
Government of Jordan
Shia–Sunni relations
2004 in Jordan
2004 in Islam